Radek Havel (born May 30, 1994) is a Czech professional ice hockey defenceman. He currently plays with Piráti Chomutov in the Czech Extraliga.

Playing career
Havel made his Czech Extraliga debut playing with Piráti Chomutov debut during the 2012–13 Czech Extraliga season.

References

External links

1994 births
Living people
Czech ice hockey defencemen
Piráti Chomutov players
Sportspeople from Chomutov
HC Slavia Praha players
Orli Znojmo players
Fischtown Pinguins players
EHC Freiburg players
AZ Havířov players
Czech expatriate ice hockey players in Germany